Trebonia kvetii is a species of bacteria.

References 

Actinomycetota